The Miser's Child is a 1910 American silent film produced by Kalem Company and directed by Sidney Olcott.

Production notes
The film was shot in Jacksonville, Florida.

References
 The Moving Picture World, vol 6, p 314 ; p 339 
 The New York Dramatic Mirror, March 5, 1910, p 18.

External links
 AFI Catalog

 The Miser's Child website dedicated to Sidney Olcott

1910 films
Silent American drama films
American silent short films
Films set in Florida
Films shot in Jacksonville, Florida
Films directed by Sidney Olcott
1910 short films
1910 drama films
American black-and-white films
1910s American films